Ivanchenko is a surname. Notable people with the surname include:

 Aleksandr Ivanchenko (born 1945), Russian writer
 Dositheus (Ivanchenko) (1884–1984), bishop of the Russian Orthodox Church
 Gennady Ivanchenko (born 1947), Soviet weightlifter
 Ivan Ivanchenko (born 1998), Russian footballer

See also
 

Ukrainian-language surnames